Stoke City Football Club Women are an English women's association football club affiliated with Stoke City. They are currently members of the FA Women's National League North.

The club were formed in the summer of 2001 and had a successful first season in the West Midlands league Division One finishing third before gaining promotion to the Premier Division via the play-offs. Season 2008–09 saw the Ladies gain promotion into the Midland Combination League. A title-winning 2012–13 campaign saw the team gain promotion to the FA Women's Premier League Northern Division.

History

Early history
An early Stoke Ladies team was formed in 1921 by Len Bridgett, a director at Stoke. His side were generally referred as "Stoke United" and their games were mostly for charitable causes. They played against Dick, Kerr's Ladies from Preston twice in April 1921 in aid of the Royal Staffordshire Infirmary. However, in December 1921 the FA banned woman's football claiming it to be "unsuitable for females". Undeterred Bridgett arranged for his side to play in Barcelona against French side Les Sportives de Paris. They played two matches against Paris and won both. Their final match was against Dick Kerr's in Colne, on 22 September 1923.

Modern history
Stoke City Ladies were formed in 2001 and began playing in the West Midlands League Division One, the sixth tier of Woman's football in England. They finished in third position gaining promotion to the West Midlands League Premier Division. They spent the next seven season's in the fifth tier before winning the league title in 2008–09 after amassing 81 points scoring 95 goals and conceding only 14 in just 22 matches. They also won the Staffordshire County Cup four time in a row from 2009 to 2012. In March 2013 with the side well on top of the Midland Combination League the club decided to apply to join the expanding FA Woman's Super League, however their attempt was unsuccessful. They won their sixth County Cup by beating their reserve team 5–1 on 19 March 2013. They won the Midland Combination League title on 26 March 2013 beating Leafield Athletic 1–0.

The club re-branded in July 2019 dropping the "Ladies" sub-title becoming Stoke City F.C. Women. In March 2023 it was announced that the team are to turn semi-professional for the 2023–24 season.

Honours

Leagues
 Midland Combination League champions: 2012–13
 West Midlands League Premier Division champions: 2008–09
 West Midlands League Division One third-place promotion: 2001–02

Cups
 Staffordshire County Cup: (13) 2006–07, 2008–09, 2009–10, 2010–11, 2011–12, 2012–13, 2013–14, 2014–15, 2015–16, 2016–17, 2017–18, 2018–19, 2021–22
 Midland Combination League Cup: 2012–13

League history
Source:

References

External links
 

Women's football clubs in England
Association football clubs established in 2001
Sport in Stoke-on-Trent
2001 establishments in England
Stoke City F.C.
FA Women's National League teams